The Viola Formation is a geologic formation in Oklahoma. It preserves fossils dating back to the Ordovician period.

See also

 List of fossiliferous stratigraphic units in Oklahoma
 Paleontology in Oklahoma

References

 

Ordovician geology of Oklahoma